This is a list of official trips made by Edi Rama as the 33rd Prime Minister of the Republic of Albania.

2013
The following international trips were made by Prime Minister Edi Rama in 2013:

2014 

The following international trips were made by Prime Minister Edi Rama in 2014:

2015 

The following international trips were made by Prime Minister Edi Rama in 2015:

2016 

The following international trips were made by Prime Minister Edi Rama in 2016:

2017 

The following international trips were made by Prime Minister Edi Rama in 2017:

2018
The following international trips were made by Prime Minister Edi Rama in 2018:

2019
The following international trips were made by Prime Minister Edi Rama in 2019:

Future trips 

The following international trips are scheduled to be made by Edi Rama during 2019:

See also 
 Edi Rama
 Prime Minister of Albania
 Politics of Albania

References

Lists of 21st-century trips
21st century in international relations
Rama
Rama, Edi
Rama, Edi
Rama, Edi